Frank Ramsay McNinch House is a historic home located at Charlotte, Mecklenburg County, North Carolina.  It was built about 1925 for Charlotte mayor Frank R. McNinch, and is a two-story, five bay, Colonial Revival style white frame dwelling.  It is sheathed in weatherboard and has flanking exterior end chimneys.  It features a prominent two-story, full-facade porch supported by six heavy, square, Tuscan order-style wooden piers.  Also on the property is a contributing servant's quarters/garage.

It was listed on the National Register of Historic Places in 1999.

References

Houses on the National Register of Historic Places in North Carolina
Colonial Revival architecture in North Carolina
Houses completed in 1925
Houses in Charlotte, North Carolina
National Register of Historic Places in Mecklenburg County, North Carolina